Rytíři Kladno is a Czech professional ice hockey team based in the city of Kladno. They are currently a member of the Czech Extraliga. The team president and owner is Jaromír Jágr, a former NHL player, who is currently playing in home games for the team in addition to his ownership and administrative roles. The team plays its home games at ČEZ Stadion.

History

Kladno was a particularly strong team in the late 1970s, when it won four consecutive league titles (1975–1978), and again in 1980.  The team's star, Milan Nový, was league MVP in 1977, 1981, and 1982, and won six scoring titles. František Pospíšil was league MVP in 1971 and 1972.

Before season 1997/1998 happened what everyone expected for some time, Kladno lost its longtime sponsor, ironworks . After a long time the Poldi disappeared from Kladno hockey jerseys and the successes that this famous club has achieved in previous years have also disappeared and was de facto always last. Primarily the lack of funds did not allow to management improvement of club cadre and the main coach resigned.

Despite the departure of a number of players abroad, Kladno did not go bad after 2003 and celebrated return to the Czech highest-level league. However after the season 2012-13 Kladno performed poorly in the extraliga. Nor the withdrawal of coaches helped, the team reached the highest league again after the 12 years.

Jaromír Jágr played for his hometown Kladno for parts of four seasons, including during the NHL lockouts in 1994, 2004, and 2012. In January 2018, Jágr was assigned to HC Kladno after a partial season with the Calgary Flames. Jágr took over majority ownership from his father in 2011.

During the 2010–2011 season, the team was docked 6 points for having used players who were not correctly registered to the club, an affair which also involved the clubs BK Mladá Boleslav and HC Plzeň.

Honours

Domestic
Czech Extraliga
  3rd place (1): 1993–94

Czech 1. Liga
  Winners (2): 2002–03, 2020–21
  Runners-up (2): 2017–18, 2018–19
  3rd place (1): 2016–17

Czechoslovak Extraliga
  Winners (6): 1958–59, 1974–75, 1975–76, 1976–77, 1977–78, 1979–80
  Runners-up (1): 1981–82
  3rd place (2): 1971–72, 1980–81

1st. Czech National Hockey League
  Winners (3): 1983–84, 1984–85, 1986–87

2nd. Czechoslovak Hockey League
  Winners (1): 1954–55
  3rd place (1): 1953–54

International
IIHF European Cup
  Winners (1): 1976–77
  Runners-up (3): 1975–76, 1977–78, 1978–79
  3rd place (1): 1980–81

Club names
 1924 – HOSK Kladno
 1948 – Sokol Kladno
 1977 – Poldi SONP Kladno
 1995 – HC Poldi Kladno
 1997 – HC Velvana Kladno
 2000 – HC Vagnerplast Kladno
 2003 – HC Rabat Kladno
 2007 – HC GEUS OKNA Kladno
 2010 – HC Vagnerplast Kladno
 2011 – Rytíři Kladno

Players

Current roster

Summary of league participations
 1951–1953: First Ice Hockey League (highest-level league in Czechoslovakia)
 1953–1955: Celostátní soutěž (second-level league in Czechoslovakia)
 1955–1983: First Ice Hockey League (highest-level league in Czechoslovakia)
 1983–1985: 1. ČNHL (second-level league in Czechoslovakia)
 1985–1986: First Ice Hockey League (highest-level league in Czechoslovakia)
 1986–1987: 1. ČNHL (second-level league in Czechoslovakia)
 1987–1993: First Ice Hockey League (highest-level league in Czechoslovakia)
 1993–2002: Czech Extraliga (highest-level league in the Czech Republic)
 2002–2003: 1st Czech Republic Hockey League (second-level league in the Czech Republic)
 2003–2014: Czech Extraliga (highest-level league in the Czech Republic)
 2014–2019 : WSM Liga (second-level league in the Czech Republic)
 2019–20 : Czech Extraliga (highest-level league in the Czech Republic)
 2020–21 : 1st Czech Republic Hockey League
 2021–present : Czech Extraliga (highest-level league in the Czech Republic)

NHL alumni

  Patrik Eliáš 
  Micheal Frolík-Kunglon 
  Milan Hnilička 
  Ivan Huml 
  Jaro Jagkinonoff
  František Kaberle
  Tomáš Kaberle
  Milan Nový
  Pavel Patera 
  Michal Pivoňka
  Tomáš Plekanec
  Martin Procházka
  Pavel Skrbek
  Radek Smoleňák
  Petr Tenkrát
  Jiří Tlustý
  Tomáš Vokoun
  Marek Židlický
  Radko Gudas
  Ondřej Pavelec
  Jakub Voráček
  Jiří Sekáč

See also
 :Category:Rytíři Kladno players

References

External links

 Official website 
 Kladno Sport
 Rytíři Kladno - Facebook
 Meltzer, Bill.  "Kladno: Small Town, Big Draft Legacy" article at NHL.com Retrieved 06–27–06.

Sport in Kladno
Ice hockey teams in the Czech Republic
Ice hockey teams in Czechoslovakia
Ice hockey clubs established in 1924
1924 establishments in Czechoslovakia